Ustaz Haji Adee Suhardee bin Haji Muhidin (born 26 September 1979) is a Bruneian former international footballer who played as a midfielder.

Adee played as a Brunei youth international in the late nineties, and was selected for the 2002 FIFA World Cup qualifying matches from April to May in 2001 at the age of 21. He made his full Brunei debut against Yemen as a late substitute for Rosanan Samak in a 0-5 loss.
 He went on to start four of the six qualifying games which all ended in defeats. He was also with the Brunei under-23 team that participated in the 21st SEA Games, featuring for the Young Wasps twice against Vietnam and Indonesia.

Adee however subsequently focused on his studies, pursuing a career as an Islamic religious education officer. He graduated from Universiti Brunei Darussalam in 2004, and taught at schools namely SR Lamunin, SM Sayyidina Abu Bakar and SUAMPRI Pengiran Anak Damit.

Kasuka FC, a team that withdrew from the 2007-08 Brunei Premier League, reformed in 2014 and entered the Brunei Premier League in 2015. Adee was registered as a player in that season, and celebrated promotion to the Brunei Super League by finishing in third place (Tabuan U18 in second place could not be promoted). He was appointed team manager in 2018.

In February 2020, he was elected as a member of the executive committee of the National Football Association of Brunei Darussalam.

He became team manager of the Brunei national under-23 football team in 2022.

References

External links

1979 births
Living people
Association football midfielders
Bruneian footballers
Brunei international footballers
Bruneian football managers
Competitors at the 2001 Southeast Asian Games
Southeast Asian Games competitors for Brunei
Universiti Brunei Darussalam alumni